The Pontra Maris is a multipurpose/cable-laying barge owned by Stemat Marine Services in Rotterdam. It was constructed at Verolme Scheepswerf Heusden N.V. shipyard in Heusden, Netherlands, and first launched in 1970.

References 

Ships of the Netherlands

1970 ships
Barges